The year 2018 is the 5th year in the history of the Kunlun Fight, a kickboxing promotion based in China. 2018 started with Kunlun Fight 69.

The events were broadcasts through television agreements in mainland China with Jiangsu TV and around the world with various other channels. The events were also streamed live on the Kunlun Fight app and multiple other services. Traditionally, most Kunlun Fight events have both tournament fights and superfights (single fights).

2018 KLF Tournament Champions

Events lists

List of Kunlun Fight events

List of Kunlun Combat Professional League events

List of Road to Kunlun events

Kunlun Fight 69

Kunlun Fight 69 was a kickboxing event held by Kunlun Fight on February 4, 2018 at the Guanshan Lake International Conference Center in Guiyang, China.

Background
This event had the 4-man finals for both the 70 kg and 100+kg tournaments that were held throughout 2017. Featured on the card were also Kunlun Fight 75 kg champion Vitaly Gurkov and Buakaw Banchamek.

2017 KLF 70 kg World Championship Tournament bracket

2017 100+kg World Championship Tournament bracket

Results

Kunlun Fight 70 

Kunlun Fight 70 was a kickboxing event held by Kunlun Fight on March 11, 2018 at the Mangrove Tree International Conference Center in Sanya, Hainan, China.

Background
This event featured two 4-Man 70-kilogram qualifying Tournaments to earn a spot in 2018 KLF 70 kg World Championship Tournament.

2018 KLF 70 kg World championship Qualifying bracket 1

2018 KLF 70 kg World championship Qualifying bracket 2

Results

Kunlun Fight 71

Kunlun Fight 71 was a kickboxing event held by Kunlun Fight on April 1, 2018 at the Mangrove Tree Convention Center in Qingdao, China.

Background
This event featured two 4-Man 70-kilogram qualifying Tournaments to earn a spot in 2018 KLF 70 kg World Championship Tournament.

2018 KLF 70 kg World championship Qualifying bracket 3

2018 KLF 70 kg World championship Qualifying bracket 4

Results

Kunlun Fight 72 

Kunlun Fight 72 was a kickboxing event held by Kunlun Fight on April 15, 2018 at the Kunlun World Combat Sports Center in Beijing, China.

Background
This event featured two 4-Man 70-kilogram qualifying Tournaments to earn a spot in 2018 KLF 70 kg World Championship Tournament.

2018 KLF 70 kg World championship Qualifying bracket 5

2018 KLF 70 kg World championship Qualifying bracket 6

Results

Kunlun Fight 73

Kunlun Fight 73 was a kickboxing event held by Kunlun Fight on May 6, 2018 at the Mangrove Tree International Conference Center in Sanya, Hainan, China.

Background
This event featured a 8-Man 70-kilogram qualifying Tournaments to earn a spot in 2018 KLF 70 kg World Championship Tournament.

2018 KLF 70 kg World championship Qualifying bracket 7

Results

Kunlun Fight 74 

Kunlun Fight 74 was a kickboxing event held by Kunlun Fight on May 13, 2018 in Jinan, China.

Background
This event featured a 8-Man 61.5-kilogram Tournaments to earn the 2018 KLF 61.5 kg World Championship.

2018 KLF 61.5 kg World Championship Tournament bracket

1Zhao Chongyang was injured and couldn't participate in the second round of the Grand Prix, and was subsequently replaced by reserve fight winner Jiang Feng.

Results

Kunlun Fight World Tour: Russia

Kunlun Fight World Tour: Russia was a Mixed martial arts event held by Kunlun Fight and Modern Fighting Pankration on May 26, 2018 at the Platinum Arena in Khabarovsk, Russia.

Results

Kunlun Fight Macao

Kunlun Fight Macao was a kickboxing event held by Kunlun Fight at the Macau Forum on June 1, 2018 in Macau, China.

Results

Kunlun Fight 75

Kunlun Fight 75 was a kickboxing event held by Kunlun Fight on August 5, 2018 at the Mangrove Tree International Conference Center in Sanya, Hainan, China.

Background
This event featured the round of 16 of the 2018 KLF 70-kilogram world championship tournament.

Superbon Banchamek has been forced to withdraw from his scheduled Final 16 bout with Nayanesh Ayman due to an injury. The bout was rescheduled to Kunlun Fight 76. Ayman instead faced Jiao Zhou in a 72 kg bout.

2018 KLF 70 kg World Championship Tournament bracket
1Yohann Drai was injured and couldn't participate in the tournament, and was subsequently replaced by Nayanesh Ayman.
2Superbon Banchamek had to pull out the tournament because of the flu, Russian Anatoly Moiseev stepped in on short notice to square off against Morocco's Marouan Toutouh.

Results

Kunlun Fight 76

Kunlun Fight 76 was a kickboxing event held by Kunlun Fight on September 9, 2018 at the Solife Stadium in Zhangqiu, China.

Background
This event featured a 8-Female 60-kilogram Tournaments to earn the 2018 KLF 60 kg Mulan Legend World Championship.

2018 KLF 60 kg Mulan Legend World Championship Tournament bracket

Results

Kunlun Fight 77

Kunlun Fight 77 was a kickboxing event held by Kunlun Fight on October 13, 2018 at the Kunlun Fight Stadium in Tongling, China.

Background
Superbon Banchamek had to pull out the tournament because of the flu, Russian Anatoly Moiseev stepped in on short notice to square off against Morocco's Marouan Toutouh.

Results

Kunlun Fight 78 

Kunlun Fight 78 was a kickboxing event held by Kunlun Fight on October 22, 2018 at the Kunlun Fight Stadium in Tongling, Anhui, China

Background
This event featured a 8-man 75-kilogram Tournaments to earn the 2018 KLF 75 kg World Championship.

2018 KLF 75 kg World Championship Tournament bracket

Results

Kunlun Fight Elite Fight Night 1 

Kunlun Fight Elite Fight Night 1 was a kickboxing event held by Kunlun Fight on November 5, 2018 at the Kunlun Fight Stadium in Tongling, Anhui, China.

Results

Kunlun Fight Elite Fight Night 2 

Kunlun Fight Elite Fight Night 2 was a kickboxing event held by Kunlun Fight on November 6, 2018 at the Kunlun Fight Stadium in Tongling, Anhui, China.

Results

Kunlun Fight Elite Fight Night 3

Kunlun Fight Elite Fight Night 3 was a kickboxing event held by Kunlun Fight on November 19, 2018 at the Kunlun Fight Stadium in Tongling, Anhui, China.

Results

Kunlun Fight 79 

Kunlun Fight 79 was a kickboxing event held by Kunlun Fight on December 15, 2018 at the Shanxi Sports Center Gymnasium in Taiyuan, China.

Background
This event featured a 8-man 66-kilogram Tournaments to earn the 2018 KLF 66 kg World Championship.

2018 KLF 66 kg World Championship Tournament bracket

Results

See also
List of Kunlun Fight events
2018 in Glory 
2018 in Glory of Heroes
2018 in K-1
2018 in ONE Championship
2018 in Romanian kickboxing

References

2018 in kickboxing
Kickboxing in China
Kunlun Fight events
2018 in Chinese sport